Kanchipuram, or Kānchi or Kāncheepuram, is a famous temple city in the Indian state of Tamil Nadu. It served as the capital city of the Pallava Kingdom. It is also known by its former names Kanchiampathi, Conjeevaram, and the nickname "The City of Thousand Temples"  It is now the Administrative headquarters of Kanchipuram district.  Kanchipuram is located 72 kilometers from Chennai, the capital city of the southern state of Tamil Nadu, India.

Kanchipuram is considered one of the seven holiest cities to the Hindus of India.  In Hinduism, a kshetra is a sacred ground, a field of active power, a place where moksha, final release can be obtained. The Garuda Purana enumerates seven cities as providers of moksha, namely Ayodhya, Mathura, Haridwar, Varanasi, Avantikā, Dvārakā, and Kanchipuram.

List of temples 

Among the major Hindu temples in Kanchipuram are some of the most prominent Vishnu Temples and Shiva Temples of Tamil Nadu like the Varadharaja Perumal Temple for Vishnu and the Ekambaranatha Temple which is the "earth abode" of Shiva. Kamakshi Amman Temple, Kumara Kottam, Kachapeshwarar Temple, and the Kailasanathar Temple are some of the other prominent temples.

 Divya Desams - temples dedicated to Vishnu glorified in the Nalayira Divya Prabandham, the early medieval Tamil literature canon of the Alvar saints from the 6th–9th centuries CE. There are 15 Divya Desams in Kanchipuram.
 Padal petra stalam - where the three of the most revered Nayanars (Shaiva Saints), Appar, Sundarar, and Sambandar have glorified the Shiva temples in Tevaram during the 7th-8th centuries. There are 11 padal petra stalams in Kanchipuram.

References

Sources

.

.
.

External links

 Thirukalukundram temple

 *
Kanchipuram
Hindu temples in Kanchipuram